KRF or KrF may refer to:
 Christian Democratic Party (Norway) (Kristelig Folkeparti, KrF)
 Kataeb Regulatory Forces, Lebanon, 1961-1977
 Korea Research Foundation, later National Research Foundation of Korea
 Krypton fluoride, KrF, a short-lived chemical compound
 KrF laser